WZXV (99.7 FM) is a radio station broadcasting a Christian radio format. Licensed to Palmyra, New York, United States, the station serves the Rochester area and, through a network of translators, most of central and western New York (southwestern New York is instead served by a sister church). The station is currently owned by Calvary Chapel of the Finger Lakes, Inc.

The station operates as a noncommercial religious station; the main frequency and all of its translators are nonetheless in the commercial FM band, above 92 MHz.

Translators

External links
 

ZXV
Radio stations established in 1977